The 2011 Western New York Flash season was the team's inaugural and only season in the Women's Professional Soccer league, after competing as the Buffalo Flash in the USL W-League. The Western New York Flash won the league, then went on to win the 2011 WPS championship over the Philadelphia Independence.

Review 

The Flash joined the Women's Professional Soccer league as an expansion team in 2011, following its undefeated championship season in the USL W-League in 2010 as the Buffalo Flash. The team retained Aaran Lines, who coached the Flash the prior two seasons in the W-League, as its head coach, and remained under the ownership of Joe Sahlen.

Squad

First-team squad 

As of August 16, 2011

Transfers

In

Out

Squad statistics 
Source: WPS

Squad statistics are of the regular season only.

Club

Management

Competitions

Women's Professional Soccer

Pre-season

Regular season

Results by round

Home/Away Results

League table

WPS Playoffs

Awards

WPS Player of the Week

WPS Player of the Month

WPS year-end awards 

Source: 2011 WPS Year End Awards

WPS Best XI 

* – unanimous selection
Source: WPS Announces Best XI of 2011

See also 

 2011 Women's Professional Soccer season
 2011 Women's Professional Soccer Playoffs

References 

2011
Western New York Flash
Western New York Flash
Western New York Flash